Agathe Meunier (born 9 January 1993) is a French female acrobatic gymnast. With partners Laura Viaud and Léna Carrau, Meunier competed in the 2014 Acrobatic Gymnastics World Championships.

References

External links 
 

1993 births
Living people
French acrobatic gymnasts
Female acrobatic gymnasts
Place of birth missing (living people)